"And the Healing Has Begun" is a song written by Northern Irish singer-songwriter Van Morrison and recorded on his 1979 album, Into the Music.

Recording and composition
"And the Healing Has Begun" was recorded at the Record Plant Studios in Sausalito, California in spring 1979 with Mick Glossop acting as engineer.

Biographer Brian Hinton calls it the central song in the album and perhaps in Morrison's whole career: "It starts just like 'Cyprus Avenue', no coincidence as the line about 'songs from way back when' hints, and with a walk down the avenue (of dreams), to the sound of a haunted violin. A song of full, blazing sex as well as revelation. The healing here is like that in Arthurian myth, the wounded King restored through the action of the Holy Grail, but it is also through as graphic a seduction, almost, as the original live version of 'Gloria.

Author Clinton Heylin concludes that "what makes the song, and indeed Into the Music work is its self-awareness. Gone is the awkward self-consciousness... It is replaced by a newly assured tone, born of a genuine awareness of what he (Morrison) was attempting."

Personnel
Van Morrison: vocals, guitar
John Allair: organ
Herbie Armstrong: guitar
David Hayes: bass guitar
Mark Jordan: piano
Toni Marcus:  violin, viola
Peter Van Hooke: drums

Covers
Glen Hansard covered the song in the 2006 musical film, Once (Collector's Edition of Original Soundtrack). The Waterboys live performance in 1986 is one of the tracks on their album, Live Adventures of the Waterboys. Bronagh Gallagher covered it as part of the Hot Press Rave On Van Morrison project to celebrate Morrison's 75th birthday.

Notes

References
Hinton, Brian (1997). Celtic Crossroads: The Art of Van Morrison, Sanctuary, 
Heylin, Clinton (2003). Can You Feel the Silence?, Chicago Review Press 

Van Morrison songs
1979 songs
Songs written by Van Morrison
Song recordings produced by Van Morrison